Nguyễn Hằng Tcheuko Minh (born as Benoit Elmakoua Tcheuko; born 18 August 1983 in Cameroon) is a Cameroonian retired footballer.

References

Cameroonian footballers
Living people
Association football midfielders
1983 births
Dong Thap FC players